Ndue Marashi (1933 – 16 December 1975) was an Albanian politician and mayor of Tirana from 1973 through 1975.

Biography 
He was born in the outskirts of Shkodër in 1933. He died on December 16, 1975. The cause of death was reportedly a suicide.

References

Mayors of Tirana
1975 deaths
1933 births